Mustafa Qureshi is a Pakistani film and television actor. 

He has acted in more than 600 movies, in Urdu, Punjabi and Sindhi languages. 

He is best remembered for playing the antagonist Noori Natt in Maula Jatt (1979).

He was born into a Sindhi family, despite his later work mainly in Punjabi cinema. 

Qureshi won Nigar Award for Best Supporting Actor for his performance in Lal Aandhi (1979). He then won his first Nigar Award for Best Actor for 1981 film Sher Khan. He won his third Nigar Award and second in best actor category for his role in Rustam Tey Khan. 

He was awarded Pride of Performance in 1988. 

He has voiced Germander in the Commander Safeguard animated series.

Early life and career

Qureshi was born in Hyderabad, Sindh, on 11 May 1938, and received primary education in Hyderabad, combining both modern and religious studies, later on gaining  a Master of Arts degree in Islamic history from Sindh University, being particularly influenced by the scholars Imdad Ali Imam Ali Kazi and Ali Muhammad Rashidi, while after his graduation he began his professional career as a host on Radio Pakistan's programme Ahsan Jo Pakistan ("Our Pakistan" in Sindhi), in 1957.

One day he went to see the shooting of  the film Aag Ka Darya (1966) and was spotted by cameraman and future film director Raza Mir, who asked him to act as a villain in his upcoming film, Laakhon Mein Ek (1967). Qureshi initially could not see himself becoming an actor, so he had to be convinced by Mir. Eventually Qureshi agreed to do the film, which became a box-office hit. As of 2016, his film career has spanned 45 years.

Politics

Having been associated with the Pakistan Peoples' Party since he met Zulfiqar Ali Bhutto, describing himself as an "ideological worker" and at one point even becoming head of PPP’s culture wing, over the decades, like many Bhutto loyalists, he eventually became disillusioned with how the party evolved, and has since 2018 been associated with Imran Khan's Pakistan Tehreek-e-Insaf.

Family

He met his wife, Rubina Qureshi (d. 2022), a Sindhi folk singer, while both were working for Radio Pakistan, as she was a prominent singer who "sang about 10,000 songs and the total recording time of her songs was more than 50 hours."

Actor and musician Aamir Qureshi is his son.

Filmography

Notable films
 Lakhon Mein Aik (1967). Mustafa Qureshi's debut film. He was introduced in this film by film director Raza Mir 
 Andleeb (1969)
 Toofan (1976)
 Zindagi (1978)
 Maula Jatt (1979)
 Lal Aandhi (1979)
 Ghulami (1985)
 Jeeva (1995)
 Sargam (1995)
 Chief Sahib (1996)
 Zill-e-Shah (2008)
 Shareeka (2012)
 Sultanat (2014)
 Shor Sharaba (2018)
 Tere Bajre Di Rakhi (2022)

Awards and recognition

 Pride of Performance Award in 1988 by the President of Pakistan

Nigar Awards

Won – Nigar Award for Best Supporting Actor – Lal Aandhi (1979)
Won – Nigar Award for Best Supporting Actor – Sher Khan (1981)
Won – Nigar Award for Best Supporting Actor – Rustam Tey Khan (1983)

References

External links

 
 Mustafa Qureshi's BBC Radio 1 interview

1938 births
Living people
Pakistani male television actors
Pakistani male film actors
Sindhi people
Recipients of the Pride of Performance
20th-century Pakistani male actors
21st-century Pakistani male actors
People from Hyderabad, Sindh
Nigar Award winners
University of Sindh alumni
Pakistani actor-politicians
Male actors in Sindhi cinema
Male actors in Punjabi cinema
Male actors in Urdu cinema
Male actors in Pashto cinema